Land That I Love is a compilation album by American musician Charlie Daniels. Released on August 8, 2010, the album consists of Daniels' previously recorded patriotic work, as well as two new songs, "Iraq Blues" and "(What This World Needs is) A Few More Rednecks 2010". Charlie Daniels felt that "it was the perfect time for a compilation of patriotic music".  Charlie Daniels said in an interview that the album is called Land That I Love because the United States of America is the land that he loves.

Track listing

New Songs
(What This World Needs is) A Few More Rednecks

The "Redneck" term has negative perceptions in the culture of people down South. They think that a redneck is a person that drives around in their truck, throwing bottles out the window, looking for people to beat up. To Daniels, "that's not a redneck, that's an idiot." Daniels considers rednecks to be the mass of hardworking people who make America work and bring common sense and efficiency to their everyday lives.“I’ve always liked this song,” Daniels said, “I like the people it represents. These are my kind of people, the people I hang out with.” He did a new version of "(What This World Needs is) A Few More Rednecks" partially because "there was a line in the song about Gorbachev, and he doesn't really come up anymore".

Iraq Blues

The other new song, “Iraq Blues,” was written and recorded mainly for the people of America's military. Daniels was "trying to communicate with them". He stated that "they are great Americans and great patriots. They have a real sense of mission and are doing an important job in a hard and desolate place. But they don't complain and every day they take their lives in their own hands. I wanted them to know that we appreciate that."

Critical reception

Land That I Love received two and a half stars out of five from Stephen Thomas Erlewine of Allmusic. Erlewine concludes that the album "may not be a great enticement for the fan who already owns everything featured here, but it surely adds a bit of modern patriotic fervor to a collection designed for the reddest of the red states. The remakes aren't as good as the originals-- and the recitations are quite heavy-handed--but the Land That I Love delivers what it promises, no more and no less."

Chart performance
Land That I Love peaked at number 68 on the U.S. Billboard Top Country Albums chart.

References 

2010 compilation albums
Charlie Daniels albums
E1 Music compilation albums